In enzymology, a mannose-6-phosphate 6-reductase is an enzyme that catalyzes the chemical reaction

D-mannitol 1-phosphate + NADP+  D-mannose 6-phosphate + NADPH + H+

Thus, the two substrates of this enzyme are D-mannitol 1-phosphate and NADP+, whereas its 3 products are D-mannose 6-phosphate, NADPH, and H+.

This enzyme belongs to the family of oxidoreductases, specifically those acting on the CH-OH group of donor with NAD+ or NADP+ as acceptor. The systematic name of this enzyme class is D-mannitol-1-phosphate:NADP+ 6-oxidoreductase. Other names in common use include NADPH-dependent mannose 6-phosphate reductase, mannose-6-phosphate reductase, 6-phosphomannose reductase, NADP+-dependent mannose-6-P:mannitol-1-P oxidoreductase, NADPH-dependent M6P reductase, and NADPH-mannose-6-P reductase.

References

 

EC 1.1.1
NADPH-dependent enzymes
Enzymes of unknown structure